The Canton of Cap Corse is an administrative division of the French department of Haute-Corse, Corsica. It was created at the French canton reorganisation which came into effect in March 2015. Its seat is in San-Martino-di-Lota.

It consists of the following communes:
 
Barrettali
Brando
Cagnano
Canari
Centuri
Ersa
Farinole
Luri
Meria
Morsiglia
Nonza
Ogliastro
Olcani
Olmeta-di-Capocorso
Patrimonio
Pietracorbara
Pino
Rogliano
Sisco
San-Martino-di-Lota
Santa-Maria-di-Lota
Tomino

References

Cantons of Haute-Corse